The dwarf tyrant-manakin or dwarf tyranneutes (Tyranneutes stolzmanni) is a species of bird in the family Pipridae.

Distribution and habitat
It is found throughout most of the Amazon Basin, except the area east of the Rio Negro. Rarely found at the edges of the forest, it prefers being at the mid-strata level deep in the forest. Its natural habitat is subtropical or tropical moist lowland forests.

Description
The dwarf tyrant-manakin is dull olive above, but lightens to a yellow-olive below. It has a short tail.

Behavior
These birds rarely move, but produce a distinctive two-note call, which readily identifies them.

References

dwarf tyrant-manakin
Birds of the Amazon Basin
dwarf tyrant-manakin
Taxonomy articles created by Polbot